Michael William Charles (born September 23, 1962), nicknamed "the Beast from the East", is a former professional American football player who played nine seasons in the National Football League (NFL).

References

1962 births
Living people
Players of American football from Newark, New Jersey
American football defensive tackles
Syracuse Orange football players
Miami Dolphins players
San Diego Chargers players
Los Angeles Raiders players
Los Angeles Rams players